Nealcidion adjunctum is a species of beetle in the family Cerambycidae. It was described by Thomson in 1865.

References

Nealcidion
Beetles described in 1865